Luyendyk Racing is an Indy Racing League team owned by two-time Indianapolis 500 winner Arie Luyendyk that fielded a Panoz-Honda for his son, Arie Luyendyk Jr. in the 2006 Indianapolis 500. The team received technical assistance from Chip Ganassi Racing and Arie Jr. started 31st and finished 28th after handling issues in his rookie "500".

IndyCar Series teams
American auto racing teams
Indy Lights teams